WYSO (91.3 FM) is a radio station in Yellow Springs, Ohio, near Dayton, community owned and operated; formerly licensed and operated by Antioch College.  It is the flagship National Public Radio member station for the Miami Valley, including the cities of Dayton and Springfield.  WYSO signed on in 1958 and has the distinction of being located in one of the smallest villages to host an NPR affiliate station.  WYSO broadcasts in the HD Radio format.  WYSO was originally on 91.5 MHz. It moved to 91.3 MHz in 1980.

History 

WYSO started in 1958 as a student and faculty station with a 10-watt transmitter located at the student union building of Antioch College, on the air for only 4 hours a day.  The station increased power from 16-watts to 360 watts in 1960, and the introduction of permanent paid staff began a move towards reflecting and serving a larger community. At that time, WYSO was known as a university-based community radio station. Significantly, several Antioch College students and other volunteers took it upon themselves to be involved with an incipient community and public radio movement in the United States. Several of those individuals have occupied key positions since that time—out of proportion to the Dayton market’s modest size.

Before NPR affiliation, nearly all of the station's programming was locally originated. The station had carried live Metropolitan Opera radio broadcasts, ad hoc networks set up by anti-Vietnam War activists, and a few recorded syndicated programs. "WYSO People's News" a local news program, was aired in the 1970s and 1980s. The rest of WYSO's program schedule was eclectic and block programming.  As at other community radio stations in the United States, NPR affiliation was viewed with suspicion by some insiders, but the attendant money from the Corporation for Public Broadcasting led to a permanent staff and a local fundraising mandate.

WYSO became an NPR member station and started broadcasting All Things Considered in 1973. The eventual popularity of NPR's news and information programming was not foreseen at the time and there were endless discussions about how the newly energized medium of noncommercial radio would best serve the community. The topic of local versus national origination was an important, but not the only, subject of debate.  The decision to replace morning Bluegrass music, local and unique to the region, with network news in the morning was undertaken in the late 1980s. Tom and Jim Duffee and other local bluegrass musicians introduced the genre on WYSO around 1970, and it was embraced by management at the time as a link with the larger Southwest Ohio community.

In 1991, under the direction of General Manager Brian Gibbons and Program Director Ruth Dawson Yellowhawk, WYSO began the process to increase power from 10,000 watts up to 50,000, allowing the station to be heard throughout the Greater Dayton area and the Miami Valley.  The station was placed on a list in 1995 to lose CPB funding as part of a political focus on public broadcasting funding by the 104th United States Congress and House Speaker Newt Gingrich, who promised to zero out CPB funding.  80 public radio stations were initially listed for defunding due to either a lack of audience or a lack of fundraising.  Program changes during this period, including adding programs such as Fresh Air, This American Life and Marketplace, and moving to a 24-hour broadcast with the BBC World Service overnight, increased the WYSO audience, the station established new highs in listener support, and the station was removed from the so-called "dis" list in 1998.

In the spring of 2002, a group of listeners formed "Keep WYSO Local" in response to cutbacks to local programming. The cutbacks included canceling volunteer-hosted shows like the evening jazz program,  "Alternate Takes" and "Women in Music," which started in 1975 and was one of the country's longest running shows dedicated to women producers and musicians.  Those changes made room on the WYSO schedule to carry the national music program World Cafe.  The changes led to protests in the Yellow Springs community as the group debated the future of the station with the university.

General Manager Neenah Ellis, working with leadership from the station, the licensee and the community, helped lead a process for WYSO to become independently owned and operated from Antioch College in 2019, for which the college received $3.5 million as compensation. The station continued in collaboration with the college, such as by remaining in the Kettering Building on campus and by working with college students as interns.  Meanwhile, Antioch students have revived the low-watt, FCC-licensed radio station on campus — called Anti-Watt — which can be heard at 101.5 FM or streamed online.

In July 2021, the station announced it was relocating out of the Kettering Building on the Antioch College campus and into the Union School House owned by Iron Table Holdings, which in turn is owned by Yellow Springs resident and comedian Dave Chappelle.  The building, built in 1872, is being fully renovated, and a two-story addition is being constructed on the west side.  The new location, expected to be operational by January 2024, comes after expansion of WYSO’s staff, including a tripling of its reporting personnel in the prior 18 months.  The station also expects to open an auxiliary 500-square-foot storefront in Dayton in early 2023.

As of 2021, WYSO is a 50,000 watt station broadcasting 24/7 and reaching fourteen counties in southwest Ohio with a potential audience of nearly two million.  Its staff of twenty-two full-time members and dozens of volunteers produce over 40 hours of original local content each week.

Programming 
Locally produced Rise When The Rooster Crows, once a daily morning feature, now airs traditional Bluegrass music on Sunday mornings. The program moved to weekends when the station added Morning Edition from NPR, which has aired on WYSO since  the late 1980s. Bluegrass music is also aired on Saturday evenings with the program "Down Home Bluegrass."  The station carries programming from Public Radio International and BBC World Service, a segment where William Felker reads his book Poor Will's Almanack, and the locally produced Book Nook, hosted by Vick Mickunas featuring interviews with authors.

In early 2021 the station began a push to strengthen the music programming at WYSO, to fill the hole created locally with the termination of 89.7 WNKU's signal in 2017.  Among the station's 14 local music programs are “Excursions”, broadcast weekdays, dance music on "Around the Fringe" each Friday night, and “The Outside,” an experimental and contemporary music show on Sunday nights.

Current Management 
Most local programming, as measured by airtime, is produced by volunteers. Volunteers, listeners and donors to the station have asserted an unofficial role in station governance since the 1970s when the station was managed under Antioch's Community Government.

In December 2008, WYSO announced that Neenah Ellis, a public radio producer and host would be the station's next general manager.  She and her husband, NPR host and author Noah Adams, made their home in Yellow Springs.  By late 2019, Neenah Ellis was President of WYSO-owner Miami Valley Public Media, Inc., and Luke Dennis, aka Lucas Dennis, was General Manager of the station.

References

External links
91.3 WYSO

FCC History Cards for WYSO

Greene County, Ohio
YSO
NPR member stations
Radio stations established in 1958
1958 establishments in Ohio